Hissar means fort or castle in Arabic, with variants adopted into Persian (hesar, hessar) and Turkish (hisar).

Hissar, Hisar and Hesar  may refer to:

Places

Asia (South and Central)

India
Hisar (city), a city in Haryana
Hisar Airport in Hisar city, Haryana
Hisar Junction railway station
Deer Park, Hisar a park in Hisar city
Hisar Urban Agglomeration
Hisar (Lok Sabha constituency), of the lower house of the Parliament
Hisar (Vidhan Sabha constituency), in the Haryana Legislative Assembly
Hisar district, a district in Haryana
Hisar division, a division of Haryana

Tajikistan and Uzbekistan
Gissar Range, mountain range in Tajikistan and Uzbekistan
Gissar Valley, in Tajikistan
Hisor, a city in Tajikistan
Hisor District, in Tajikistan

Afghanistan and Pakistan
Hesar, Afghanistan, a village
Bala Hissar, Kabul, an ancient fortress in Kabul, Afghanistan
Bala Hissar, Peshawar, an ancient fortress in Peshawar, Pakistan
Puli Hisar District in Baghlan Province, Afghanistan

Asia (Western) with Turkey

Iran
Hesar, Iran (disambiguation), a list of places
Hisar-e Sangi, a village
Hisar Pain, a village
Tepe Hissar,  prehistoric site

Turkey
Hisar, Acıpayam
Hisar Mosque, an historic Mosque in İzmir
Hisarlik, an archaeological site believed to have been Troy
Anadoluhisarı, a fortress on the Bosporus in Istanbul, Turkey
Rumelihisarı, a fortress in Istanbul

Europe (Balkans)
Hisar Hill, a hill in southern Serbia
Hisarya, Bulgaria, a resort town
Demir Hisar (town), a town in Macedonia

Other uses
Hesar (Iranian film)
HISAR (surface to air missile system), developed in Turkey
Hughes Integrated Synthetic Aperture Radar (HISAR), used on the US-developed RQ-4 Global Hawk drones

See also

Hesarak (disambiguation), places in Afghanistan and Iran